The 2022 Wake Forest Demon Deacons women's soccer team represented Wake Forest University during the 2022 NCAA Division I women's soccer season.  The Demon Deacons were led by head coach Tony Da Luz, in his twenty-sixth season.  They played their home games at Spry Stadium.  This was the team's 28th season playing organized women's college soccer, all of which have been played in the Atlantic Coast Conference.

The Demon Deacons finished the season 9–7–3 overall and 3–6–1 in ACC ACC play to finish in ninth place. They were not invited to the ACC Tournament, but did receive an at-large invitation to the NCAA Tournament.

Previous season 

The Demon Deacons finished the season 16–6–0 overall, and 6–4–0 in ACC play to finish in sixth place.  As the sixth seed in the ACC Tournament, they defeated Duke in the First Round before losing in overtime to eventual champions Florida State in the Semifinals.  They received an at-large bid to the NCAA Tournament.  As an unseeded team, they defeated Harvard in the First Round before losing to Michigan in the Second Round to end their season.

Offseason

Departures

Recruiting Class

Source:

Squad

Roster

Team management

Source:

Schedule

Source:

|-
!colspan=6 style=""| Exhibition

|-
!colspan=6 style=""| Non-Conference Regular Season

|-
!colspan=6 style=""| ACC Regular Season

|-
!colspan=6 style=""| NCAA Tournament

Awards and honors

Rankings

2023 NWSL Draft

Source:

References

Wake Forest
Wake Forest
2021
Wake Forest women's soccer
Wake Forest